Pine Lake Township is the name of some places in the U.S. state of Minnesota:
Pine Lake Township, Cass County, Minnesota
Pine Lake Township, Clearwater County, Minnesota
Pine Lake Township, Otter Tail County, Minnesota
Pine Lake Township, Pine County, Minnesota

See also

Pine Lake (disambiguation)

Minnesota township disambiguation pages